Sulgachchy (Sulğaççı) is a rural locality (a selo), the administrative centre of and one of two settlements, in addition to Serge-Bes, in Sulgachchinsky Rural Okrug of Amginsky District in the Sakha Republic, Russia. Its population as of the 2010 Census was 444; up from 442 recorded in the 2002 Census.

References

Notes

Sources
Official website of the Sakha Republic. Registry of the Administrative-Territorial Divisions of the Sakha Republic. Amginsky District. 

Rural localities in Amginsky District